Nnegest Likké is an American film director, screenwriter and producer. She is a proud native of the Bay Area with a background in both cultures, and she is passionate about telling amusing, heartwarming, and thought-provoking stories that have an impact on society and culture. Her film awards include Best Diaspora Film at the 2016 African Movie Academy Awards (AMAA) for " Ben and Ara " which she directed. Her 2019 international romantic drama, Everything But A Man won the Audience Choice Award at the Pan African Film Festival. Nnegest is one of the first women of color to write and direct a movie distributed by a major Hollywood studio. Her directing credits include Fox Searchlight's romantic-comedy Phat Girlz, the multi-award-winning indie love drama Ben & Ara, and Everything But A Man.

Early life and education 
Nnegest Likké was born in Oakland, California. She is half African-American and half Ethiopian and grew up in the San Francisco - Oakland Bay Area.

During her childhood, Likké had the opportunity of traveling around the world, including throughout Europe and Africa with her mother who Likké referred to as an active globetrotter and Civil Rights Activist. This traveling exposed her to various ways of life besides those known in America.

Likké attended Skyline High School in Oakland. After graduating, she attended Clark Atlanta University (CAU), where she studied film and graduated with a BA in Mass Communications.

Career 
After college, Likké moved to Los Angeles to pursue screenwriting. While honing her craft, Likké taught Drama, History and English at a high school in Los Angeles. Today, she still mentors at-risk youth.

Films 
Phat Girlz (2006) was Likké's first feature film, starring Academy Award Winner Mo’Nique. This film is a romantic-comedy about two plus-size women who meet the men of their dreams in an unexpected way. Her second film was Ben & Ara, followed by her most recent film Everything But a Man starring Monica Calhoun and Jimmy Jean-Louis (2019 ). Likké wrote, directed and produced Everything But a Man, about the challenges successful, career-driven women have finding love. Likké is currently working on multiple projects for film and TV.

Filmography

Awards, Nominations and Honours 

 In 2015, Likké received an honorary mention for Best Feature Film at the All Lights India International Film Festival.
 In 2016, Likké received the Best Female Protagonist award for her film Ben & Ara at the Nevada Women's Film Festival.
 In 2016, Ben and Ara won the award for Best Diaspora film by the African Movie Academy Awards (AMAA).

References

External links

Ben and Ara
Nnegest Likké

1970 births
Film producers from California
Clark Atlanta University alumni
American people of Ethiopian descent
American women film directors
Writers from Oakland, California
Living people
Film directors from California
American women film producers
21st-century American women